Pallickal may refer to:

 Pallickal, Thiruvananthapuram, a village in Kilimanoor Block panchayat, Kerala, India
 Pallickal, Kollam, a village in Kollam district, Kerala, India
 Pallikkal, Adoor, a village in Adoor Taluk, Pathanamthitta district, Kerala, India
 Pallickal, Mavelikkara, a village near Kayamkulam, Alappuzha district, Kerala, India
 Pallickal, Nooranad, a village near Nooranad, Alappuzha district, Kerala, India
 Pallikkal Bazar, a village in Malappuram district, Kerala, India
Pallikkal River, a river in Kerala, India